Spinifex parrot may refer to the following bird species:

 Polytelis alexandrae, also known as the princess parrot
 Pezoporus occidentalis, also known as the night parrot

Birds by common name